Grant High School is a public secondary school situated in Mount Gambier, South Australia.

Students 
Grant High School has around 742 students in grades 8–12.

Facilities 
Grant High School has many facilities: a large library, three large sports ovals, a sufficient computer room, and a gymnasium. A bi-annual school production featuring a range of students is held at the Sir Robert Helpmann Theatre. Both classic and teacher-written productions have been used. At the ARIA Music Awards of 2018, the school's Scott Maxwell won Music Teacher of the Year.

Athletic programs 
Grant High School is big on sport. Its main sporting focus is on cricket, Australian rules football, baseball, netball, basketball, and soccer. A few years ago, a group of their baseball students went to Perth, Western Australia to compete in a national competition. There is also a thriving competitive chess community.

External links

References

High schools in South Australia
Public schools in South Australia
Mount Gambier, South Australia